Michel Claude André Forget (4 May 1927 – 1 October 2020) was a French military pilot.

Biography
A fighter pilot, he commanded the first overseas operation by implementing modern fighter jets and leading the Force aérienne tactique for four years. He reached the rank of army corps general before becoming a Général.

Forget served as honorary chairman of Le Souvenir français in Issy-les-Molineaux. From 1985 to 1989, he was President of the Association des anciens élèves de l'École de l'air. He died on 1 October 2020.

Distinctions
Grand Cross of the Legion of Honour (2001)
Member of the Council of the National Order of the Legion of Honour
Correspondent of the Académie des Sciences Morales et Politiques, elected on 26 October 1998 to replace Nicolas Wahl
National Vice-President of the Council of Administration of Le Souvenir français

Works
Puissance aérienne et stratégies (2001)
Guerre froide et Guerre d'Algérie : 1954-1964, témoignage sur une période agitée (2002)
Notre défense dans un monde en crise : de 1960 à nos jours (2006)
Du Vampire au Mirage : l'épopée d'une génération de pilotes de chasse (2007)
Nos forces aériennes en OPEX : un demi-siècle d'interventions extérieures (2013)
Nos armées au temps de la Ve République (2016)

References

1927 births
2020 deaths
French aviators
French Air Force generals
People from Indre-et-Loire
Grand Croix of the Légion d'honneur